Marco Paulo Paiva Rocha (born 7 February 1973), known as Paiva, is a Portuguese retired football defensive midfielder and manager.

Playing career
Born in Funchal, Madeira, Paiva came through the ranks of his hometown team C.S. Marítimo. He totalled 337 Primeira Liga games and six goals for them, S.C. Farense, Vitória de Guimarães and C.D. Santa Clara. In the second tier, he added 72 games and one goal in service of F.C. Famalicão, Santa Clara and F.C. Maia.

Paiva earned one senior cap for Portugal on 19 August 1998, in a 2–1 friendly win over Mozambique at the Estádio de São Miguel in the Azores. He came on as a substitute for double goalscorer Rui Costa with five minutes of the 2–1 win remaining.

References

External links

1973 births
Living people
Sportspeople from Funchal
Portuguese footballers
Madeiran footballers
Association football midfielders
Primeira Liga players
Liga Portugal 2 players
Segunda Divisão players
C.S. Marítimo players
F.C. Famalicão players
S.C. Farense players
Vitória S.C. players
C.D. Santa Clara players
F.C. Maia players
C.F. União players
Portugal under-21 international footballers
Portugal international footballers
Portuguese football managers
Primeira Liga managers